Hugh Jay Alexander Coflin (December 15, 1928 – April 30, 2021) was a Canadian  ice hockey player who played 31 games in the National Hockey League with the Chicago Black Hawks during the 1950–51 season. The rest of his career, which lasted from 1950 to 1960, was mainly spent in the minor Western Hockey League. Coflin was born in Blaine Lake, Saskatchewan Hugh Coflin retired in 1960.

Career statistics

Regular season and playoffs

References

External links
 

1928 births
2021 deaths
Canadian ice hockey defencemen
Chicago Blackhawks players
Edmonton Flyers (WHL) players
Humboldt Indians players
Ice hockey people from Saskatchewan
Indianapolis Capitals players
Milwaukee Sea Gulls players
Moose Jaw Canucks players
People from Blaine Lake, Saskatchewan